Malcolm Murray (born 26 July 1964) is a Scottish former professional footballer who played in the Football League for Hull City and Mansfield Town.

References

1964 births
Living people
Scottish footballers
Association football defenders
English Football League players
Mansfield Town F.C. players
Buckie Thistle F.C. players
Heart of Midlothian F.C. players
Stirling Albion F.C. players
St Johnstone F.C. players
Hull City A.F.C. players
Partick Thistle F.C. players
Clydebank F.C. (1965) players
Arbroath F.C. players
Scottish Football League players
Sportspeople from Moray
Highland Football League players
People from Buckie